In  gravitation theory, a world manifold endowed with some Lorentzian pseudo-Riemannian metric and an associated space-time structure is a space-time. Gravitation theory is formulated as classical field theory on natural bundles over a world manifold.

Topology 

A world manifold is a four-dimensional orientable real smooth manifold. It is assumed to be a Hausdorff and second countable topological space. Consequently, it is a locally compact space which is a union of a countable number of compact subsets, a separable space, a paracompact and completely regular space. Being paracompact, a world manifold admits a partition of unity by smooth functions. Paracompactness is an essential characteristic of a world manifold. It is necessary and sufficient in order that a world manifold admits a Riemannian metric and necessary for the existence of a pseudo-Riemannian metric. A world manifold is assumed to be connected  and, consequently, it is arcwise connected.

Riemannian structure 

The tangent bundle  of a world manifold  and the associated principal frame bundle  of linear tangent frames in  possess a general linear group structure group  . It is essential that the tangent and associated bundles over a world manifold admit a bundle atlas of finite number of trivialization charts.

Tangent and frame bundles over a world manifold are natural bundles characterized by general covariant transformations. These transformations are gauge symmetries of gravitation theory on a world manifold.

By virtue of the well-known theorem on structure group reduction, a structure group  of a frame bundle  over a world manifold  is always reducible to its maximal compact subgroup . Thus, a world manifold always admits a Riemannian metric which makes  a metric topological space.

Lorentzian structure 

In accordance with the geometric Equivalence Principle, a world manifold possesses a Lorentzian structure, i.e., a structure group of a frame bundle  must be reduced to a Lorentz group . It is treated as a gravitational field in General Relativity and as a classical Higgs field in gauge gravitation theory.

A Lorentzian structure need not exist. Therefore, a world manifold is assumed to satisfy a certain topological condition. It is either a noncompact topological space or a compact space with a zero Euler characteristic. Usually, one also requires that a world manifold admits a spinor structure in order to describe Dirac fermion fields in gravitation theory. There is the additional topological obstruction to the existence of this structure. In particular, a noncompact world manifold must be parallelizable.

Space-time structure 

If a structure group of a frame bundle  is reducible to a Lorentz group, the latter is always reducible to its maximal compact subgroup .  Thus, there is the commutative diagram

 
 
 

of the reduction of structure groups of a frame bundle  in
gravitation theory. This reduction diagram results in the following.

(i) In gravitation theory on a world manifold , one can always choose an atlas of a frame bundle  (characterized by local frame fields ) with -valued transition functions. These transition functions preserve a time-like component  of local frame fields which, therefore, is globally defined. Accordingly, the dual time-like covector field  also is globally defined, and it yields a spatial distribution
 on  such that . Then the tangent bundle  of a world manifold  admits a space-time decomposition
, where  is a one-dimensional fibre bundle spanned by a time-like vector field . This decomposition, is called the -compatible space-time structure.  It makes a world manifold the space-time.

(ii)  Given the above-mentioned diagram of reduction of structure groups, let  and  be the corresponding
They form a triple  obeying the relation

 .

Conversely, let a world manifold  admit a nowhere vanishing
one-form  (or, equivalently, a nowhere vanishing vector
field). Then  any Riemannian metric  on  yields the
pseudo-Riemannian metric

 .

It follows that a world manifold  admits a pseudo-Riemannian

Let us note that a -compatible Riemannian metric    in a triple   defines a -compatible distance function on a world manifold . Given a gravitational field , the -compatible Riemannian metrics and the corresponding distance
functions are different for different spatial distributions 
It follows that physical observers associated  with
these different spatial distributions perceive a world manifold  as different Riemannian spaces. The well-known relativistic changes of sizes of moving bodies exemplify this phenomenon.

However, one attempts to derive a world topology directly from a space-time structure (a path topology, an Alexandrov topology). If a space-time satisfies the strong causality condition, such topologies coincide with a familiar manifold topology of a world manifold. In a general case, they however are rather extraordinary.

Causality conditions 

A space-time structure is called integrable if a spatial distribution   is involutive. In this case, its integral manifolds constitute a spatial foliation of a world manifold whose leaves are spatial three-dimensional subspaces. A spatial foliation is called causal if no curve transversal to its leaves intersects each leave more than once. This condition is equivalent to the stable causality of Stephen Hawking.  A space-time foliation is causal if and only if it is a foliation of level surfaces of some smooth real function on  whose differential nowhere vanishes. Such a foliation is a fibred manifold .
However, this is not the case of a compact world manifold which can not be

The stable causality does not provide the simplest causal structure. If a fibred manifold  is a fibre bundle, it is trivial, i.e., a world manifold  is a globally hyperbolic manifold . Since any oriented three-dimensional manifold is parallelizable, a globally
hyperbolic world manifold is parallelizable.

See also 
Spacetime
Mathematics of general relativity
Gauge gravitation theory

References 
 S.W. Hawking, G.F.R. Ellis, The Large Scale Structure of Space-Time (Cambridge Univ. Press, Cambridge, 1973) 
 C.T.G. Dodson, Categories, Bundles, and Spacetime Topology (Shiva Publ. Ltd., Orpington, UK, 1980)

External links 

Gravity
Theoretical physics